The Weiss Palace is a historic building in the center of Timișoara, Romania. It is located in Victory Square, right where the Republic Boulevard and one of the two promenades of the square begin.

History 
The Weiss Palace was built in 1912 by Arnold Merbl Co. according to the plans of Adalbert Szladek.

As its name suggests, the palace belonged to the Weiss family. It played an important role in the life of the city, being made up of doctors, entrepreneurs, industrialists and other prominent representatives of various professions. The Weiss Palace was built for the purpose of renting out the apartments in it, and the business was a profitable one for this family.

The eclectic-style building has 27 apartments, some even with six rooms, and there are shops on the ground floor.

References 

Buildings and structures in Timișoara
Buildings and structures completed in 1912